00, or double zero, may refer to:

The year 1900
 The year 2000
The year 2100
 00 Agent, an agent with a license to kill in the James Bond media
 00 gauge, a standard of model railways
 Size 00, a women's clothing size in the US catalog sizes system
 Symphony No. 00 (Bruckner), an alternate name for Anton Bruckner's Study Symphony orchestra in F minor
 Mobile Suit Gundam 00, an anime series
 00, an abbreviation used on signs to indicate a public toilet (particularly in Germany and Eastern Europe)
 00, a common international call prefix
 00, a wire diameter defined by the American wire gauge standard
 00, a fine grade of steel wool
 00, a field on the wheel of some roulette game tables
 00, an Italian type number for Flour
 A shotgun ammunition size for buckshot, about equal to 8.452 mm (0.33 inches) in diameter
 "Double Zeros" (Runaways), a TV episode
 Double Zero Records, a record label

See also 
 Zero Zero (disambiguation)
 Double O (disambiguation)
 0 (disambiguation)
 0-0 (disambiguation)
 00s (disambiguation)
 OO (disambiguation)
 0O (disambiguation)
 O0 (disambiguation)
 Leading zero